Jorge Otero Bouzas (born 28 January 1969) is a Spanish former footballer who played as either a right or left back, and is the current manager of Alondras CF.

He appeared in 317 La Liga games over 12 seasons in representation of four teams, mainly Celta.

Otero represented Spain at the 1994 World Cup and Euro 1996.

Club career
Otero was born in Nigrán, Province of Pontevedra, Galicia. He started playing for local powerhouse RC Celta de Vigo, being an undisputed starter since the age of 18 and spending five of his seven years with the first team in La Liga. He made his debut in the Spanish top division on 29 August 1987, playing the full 90 minutes in a 1–0 away win against RCD Español.

In the summer of 1994, Otero signed for Valencia CF, achieving a personal best – in the top flight – runner-up place in the 1995–96 season to which he contributed 37 games. Until his retirement in 2005, at the age of 36, he still represented Real Betis (with whom he was promoted and relegated), Atlético Madrid and Elche CF, the latter exclusively in Segunda División.

International career
Otero made his debut for the Spanish national team on 8 September 1993, in a 2–0 friendly victory over Chile in Alicante, and was a participant at the 1994 FIFA World Cup (two matches) and UEFA Euro 1996 (one).

He earned nine caps in slightly less than three years, and his last appearance was in the latter tournament, in a 1–1 group stage draw against France.

Honours
Celta
Segunda División: 1991–92

Atlético Madrid
Segunda División: 2001–02

References

External links

1969 births
Living people
Spanish footballers
Footballers from Nigrán
Association football defenders
La Liga players
Segunda División players
Tercera División players
Celta de Vigo B players
RC Celta de Vigo players
Valencia CF players
Real Betis players
Atlético Madrid footballers
Elche CF players
Spain under-21 international footballers
Spain international footballers
1994 FIFA World Cup players
UEFA Euro 1996 players
Spanish football managers
Segunda División B managers
Tercera División managers